The first season of Popstar, premiered on Rede Globo on Sunday, July 9, 2017 at 1:00 p.m. / 12:00 p.m. (BRT / AMT).

Contestants

Elimination chart
Key
 – Contestant did not perform
 – Contestant was in the bottom two and relegated to elimination zone
 – Contestant received the lowest combined score and was eliminated
 – Contestant received the highest combined score
 – Contestant received the highest combined score and won immunity
 – Contestant finished as runner-up
 – Contestant finished as the winner

Live show details

Week 1
Specialists

 Baby do Brasil
 Hamilton de Holanda
 Junior Lima
 Ludmilla
 Nando Reis
 Pretinho da Serrinha
 Samuel Rosa
 Sophia Abrahão
 Tiago Leifert
 Toni Garrido

Week 2
Specialists

 Artur Xexéo
 Liminha
 Lucy Alves
 Paula Toller
 Paulo Ricardo
 Pitty
 Sandra de Sá
 Sidney Magal
 Tony Belloto
 Xande de Pilares

Week 3
Specialists

 Gaby Amarantos
 João Marcello Bôscoli
 Junior Lima
 Luiza Possi
 Maiara Henrique
 Maraísa Henrique
 Mumuzinho
 Preta Gil
 Tiago Leifert
 Toni Garrido

Week 4
Specialists

 Baby do Brasil
 Di Ferrero
 Fafá de Belém
 Leila Pinheiro
 Marcelo Serrado
 Paulo Ricardo
 Projota
 Roberta Sá
 Roberto Menescal
 Silvio Essinger

Week 5
Specialists

 Daniel
 João Augusto
 Karol Conká
 Leo Jaime
 Maria Rita
 Martinho da Vila
 Nanda Costa
 Paulinho Moska
 Paulo Miklos
 Roberta Medina

Round 1

Round 2

Week 6
Specialists

 Danilo Caymmi
 Evandro Mesquita
 João Marcello Bôscoli
 Mariana Aydar
 Michael Sullivan
 Rosemary
 Solange Almeida
 Wanessa Camargo
 Zeca Camargo
 Zizi Possi

Week 7
Specialists

 Bruno Belutti
 Bruno Cardoso
 Fernanda Abreu
 Elba Ramalho
 Marcos Prado
 Monica Iozzi
 Naiara Azevedo
 Rogério Flausino
 Sandy
 Tiago Iorc

Week 8
Specialists

 Dennis Carvalho
 George Israel
 Fernando Bonifácio
 Joelma
 Leiloca Neves
 Paulo Lima
 Paulo Ricardo
 Preta Gil
 Rodrigo Suricato
 Sorocaba de Assis

Round 1

Round 2

Week 9
Specialists

 Ana Carolina
 César Menotti
 Dinho Ouro Preto
 Elba Ramalho
 Fabiano Silva
 Geraldo Carneiro
 Joanna
 João Barone
 Samuel Rosa
 Tato

Round 1

Round 2

Week 10
Specialists

 Ana Carolina
 Bruno Belutti
 Fafá de Belém
 Marcos Prado
 Maria Rita
 Paula Toller
 Paulo Ricardo
 Preta Gil
 Pretinho da Serrinha
 Toni Garrido

Round 1

Round 2

Round 3

Ratings and reception

Brazilian ratings
All numbers are in points and provided by Kantar Ibope Media.

References

External links
 PopStar on Gshow.com

2017 Brazilian television seasons